Rifaat Ali al-Assad (born 22 August 1937) is the younger brother of the late President of Syria, Hafez Assad, and Jamil al-Assad, and the uncle of the incumbent President Bashar al-Assad. He is alleged by  sources to be the commanding officer responsible for the Hama massacre of 1982. Later declassified material backs his claims that his brother Hafez al-Assad was responsible, as do a number of commentators. Despite accusations, Rifaat has always denied culpability. Rifaat lived in exile in France for 36 years and returned to Syria in October 2021 after being found guilty in France of acquiring millions of euros diverted from the Syrian state. In September 2022, France's highest court, the Cour de Cassation, confirmed the ruling.

Early life and education and 
Rifaat al-Assad was born in the village of Qardaha, near Lattakia in western Syria on 22 August 1937. He studied Political Science and Economics at Damascus University and was later given an honorary PhD in Politics from the Soviet Academy of Sciences.

Early experience
Rifaat joined the Syrian Arab Army in 1958 as a First Lieutenant, and was rapidly promoted after training in various Soviet military academies (mainly in the Yekaterinburg Artillery school). In 1965, he became commander of a special security force loyal to the military wing of the Ba'ath and soon, supported Hafez al-Assad's overthrow of Salah Jadid and seizure of power in 1970.
He was allowed to form his own paramilitary group, the Defense Companies, in 1971, which soon transformed into a powerful and regular military force trained and armed by the Soviet Union. He was a qualified paratrooper.

Under Hafez's rule 

Rifaat al-Assad played a key role in his brother's takeover of executive power in 1970, dubbed the Corrective Revolution, and ran the elite internal security forces and the Defense Companies in the 1970s and early 1980s. In addition to his military posture, Rifaat created the "League of Higher Graduates", which provided discussion forums on public affairs for Syrian post-graduates, outside the constraints of the Baath party. With more than fifteen branches across Syria, this cultural project gathered tens of thousands of members. He had a pivotal role throughout the 1970s and, until 1984, many saw him as the likely successor to his elder brother. Hafez Assad appointed him second vice president in March 1984.

In 1976, he visited Lebanon as a guest of Tony Frangiyeh since they had close and personal ties. Referring to their conversation later, he stated "ultimately, you [Christians] are okay as tolerated dhimmis living under Islam. Our reward for apostasy is death: Muslims will not tolerate us the way they might do you; they will kill us as offenders of their religion." referring to the fact that as Alawites the Assad family had to be staunchly secular as fundamentalist Muslims hate the Alawites as apostates even more than they hate Christians.

On 28 June 1979 fifteen men were hanged in Damascus. They had been convicted of attempting to assassinate Rifaat al-Asaad.

Foreign relations 

Numerous rumours tie Rifaat al-Assad to various foreign interests. Rifaat was close to King Abdullah of Saudi Arabia. Abdullah was married to a sister of Rifaat's wife, and Rifaat has on occasions—even after his public estrangement from the rulers in Syria—been invited to Saudi Arabia, with pictures of him and the royal family displayed in the state-controlled press.

After the Iraq War, there were press reports that he had started talks with US government representatives on helping to form a coalition with other anti-Assad groups to provide an alternative Syrian leadership, on the model of the Iraqi National Congress. Rifaat has held a meeting with the former Iraqi Prime Minister Ayad Allawi. Yossef Bodansky, the director of the US Congressional Task Force on Terrorism and Unconventional Warfare, has stated that Rifaat enjoys support from both the United States and Saudi Arabia; he has been featured in the Saudi press as visiting the royal family in 2007. The Bashar government remains wary of his intentions and carefully monitors his activities.

Rifaat was mentioned by the influential American think tank Stratfor as a possible suspect for the 2005 bombing that killed Lebanese ex-prime minister Rafiq Hariri and the string of attacks that has struck Beirut after the subsequent Syrian withdrawal. The goal would have been to destabilize the Syrian government. However, there has been no mention of Rifaat in the United Nations Mehlis reports on the crime.

In 1983, Rifaat met with PLO leader Yasir Arafat in an attempt to appease growing tensions between Syria and Arafat's loyalists.

Ion Mihai Pacepa, a general in the security forces of Communist Romania who defected to the U.S. in 1978, claimed that Rifaat al-Assad was recruited by Romanian intelligence during the Cold War. In Pacepa's 1996 novel Red Horizons, Romanian President Nicolae Ceaușescu is quoted as saying that Rifaat was "eating out of our hand" and went on to say: "Do I need a back channel for secret political communications? A way to inform Hafez secretly about my future discussions with Carter? Do I need to have somebody disappear in the West? Rifaat will take care of it. Now he can't do without my money." Pacepa later reasserted this allegation, describing Rifaat as "our well-paid agent" in a 2003 article in which he discussed the then Libyan leader Muammar Gaddafi.

Release of David S. Dodge

Rifaat al-Assad contributed to the release of US politician and educator David S. Dodge on July 21, 1983.

On July 19, 1982, Dodge was abducted by pro-Iranian militiamen, members of the Islamic Amal in Beirut, led by Hussein al-Musawi. He was first held in Lebanon and then kept captive in Iran until his release one year later. Through contacts in the Iranian regime of Khomeini, Rifaat was able to secure the release of Dodge and was publicly thanked by US president Ronald Reagan.

Hama massacre 

In February 1982, as commander of the Defense Companies, he allegedly commanded the forces that put down a Muslim Brotherhood revolt in the central city of Hama, by instructing his forces to shell the city with BM-21 Grad rockets, killing thousands of its inhabitants (reports range from between 5,000 and 40,000, the most common suggestion being around 15,000–20,000). This became known as the Hama Massacre. A declassified document from the Defense Intelligence Agency, however, estimates the total number of casualties to be approximately 2000. US journalist Thomas Friedman claims in his book From Beirut to Jerusalem that Rifaat later said that the total number of victims was 38,000. Rifaat, however, has repeatedly denied playing any role in the Hama massacre.

Rifaat al-Assad clarified his version for the Hama massacre during the conference in Paris to form the Syrian National Democratic Council on 15 November 2011. He was also implicated in the 1980 Tadmor Prison massacre and acquired the sobriquet, the "butcher of Tadmor."

Rifaat al-Assad was also mentioned in a CIA report regarding drug smuggling activities in Syria during the 1980s, along with other Syrian officials such as Ali Haydar, Mustafa Tlass and Shafiq Fayadh.

Attempted coup d'état

When Hafez al-Assad suffered from heart problems in late 1983, he established a six-member committee to run the country composed of Abdul Halim Khaddam, Abdullah al-Ahmar, Mustafa Tlass, Mustafa al-Shihabi, Abdul Rauf al-Kasm and Zuhair Masharqa. Rifaat was not included, and the council consisted entirely of close Sunni Muslim loyalists to Hafez, who were mostly lightweights in the military-security establishment. This caused unease in the Alawi-dominated officer corps, and several high-ranking officers began rallying around Rifaat, while others remained loyal to Hafez's instructions.

In March 1984, Rifaat's troops, now numbering more than 55,000 with tanks, artillery, aircraft and helicopters, began asserting control over Damascus. A squadron of Rifaat's T-72 tanks took position at the central roundabout of Kafr Sousa and in Mount Qasioun, overlooking the city. Rifaat's forces set up checkpoints and roadblocks, put up posters of him in State buildings, disarmed regular troops and arbitrarily arrested soldiers of the regular Army, occupied and commandeered Police Stations, Intelligence buildings, and State buildings; the Defense Companies rapidly outnumbered and took control over both the Special Forces and the Republican Guard. Although Damascus was divided between two armies and seemed on the brink of war, Rifaat did not move. Informed that Rifaat was heading to Damascus, his brother Hafez al Assad left his headquarters to meet him. 

There was a clear division and tensions between forces loyal to Hafez, namely the 3rd Armoured Division (commanded by General Shafiq Fayadh), the Republican Guard (commanded by General Adnan Makhlouf), the various Intelligence services (commanded by Generals Mohamed Khouli and Ali Duba), the National Police, and the Special Forces (commanded by General Ali Haidar); and the Defense Companies loyal to Rifaat. By the middle of 1984 Hafez had returned from his sick bed and assumed full control, at which point most officers rallied around him. Initially, it seemed that Rifaat was going to be put on trial and even faced a questioning that was broadcast on television. However, it is believed that Hafez's daughter Bushra actually saved her uncle by convincing her father that purging him would disgrace the family and might cause tensions not only in the Assad family, but with the Makhlouf family as well (since Rifaat is also married to a woman from that family, who are also the second most prevalent Alawite family, dominating the leadership of the security services behind the Assads). In what at first seemed a compromise, Rifaat was made vice-president with responsibility for security affairs, but this proved a wholly nominal post. Command of the 'Defense Companies', which was trimmed down to an Armoured Division size, was transferred to another officer, and ultimately the entire unit was disbanded and absorbed into other units, like the 4th Mechanized Division, the Republican Guard, and the Airborne Special Forces Division. Rifaat was then sent to the Soviet Union on "an open-ended working visit". His closest supporters and others who had failed to prove their loyalty to Hafez were purged from the army and Baath Party in the years that followed. Upon his departure, Rifaat acquired $300m of public money including a $100m Libyan loan. In 2015, he claimed that the money was a gift from Crown Prince Abdullah of Saudi Arabia back then.

During the 1990s 

Although he returned for his mother's funeral in 1992, and for some time lived in Syria, Rifaat was thereafter confined to exile in France and Spain. He nominally retained the post of vice president until 8 February 1998, when he was stripped of this. He had retained a large business empire both in Syria and abroad, partly through his son Sumer. However, the 1999 crackdown, involving armed clashes in Lattakia, destroyed much of his remaining network in Syria; large numbers of Rifaat's supporters were arrested. This was seen as tied to the issue of succession, with Rifaat having begun to position himself to succeed the ailing Hafez, who in his turn sought to eliminate all potential competition for his designated successor, his son Bashar al-Assad.

In France, Rifaat has loudly protested against the succession of Bashar to the post of president, claiming that he himself embodies the "only constitutional legality" (as vice president, alleging his dismissal was unconstitutional). He has made threatening remarks about planning to return to Syria at a time of his choosing to assume "his responsibilities and fulfill the will of the people", and that while he will rule benevolently and democratically, he will do so with "the power of the people and the army" behind him.

Groups and organizations 

Rifaat's son Sumer is the head of a minor pan-Arab TV channel, the Arab News Network (ANN), which functions as his father's political mouthpiece. He also claims to run a political party, of uncertain fortunes. Rifaat himself heads the United National Group (al-tajammu' al-qawmi al-muwahhid), which is another political party or alliance; it is known to have self-professed members among Rifaat's fellow exiles from Syria, but neither can be considered an active organization, even if they regularly release statements in favor of Rifaat's return to Syria and protesting to president Bashar al-Assad. Further, Rifaat founded the Arab Democratic Party in Lebanon in the early 1970s, a small Alawite sectarian/political group in Lebanon, which during the Lebanese Civil War acted as an armed militia loyal to the Syrian government (through Rifaat). Ali Eid, the general secretary of the party today, supports the Syrian president Bashar Al-Assad.

Distinctions

Legal issues
Since 2014, Rifaat was accused of organised money laundering, aggravated tax fraud and embezzling Syrian funds to buy property worth at least €90m in France. In addition, Spanish authorities have seized his assets and bank accounts in a money laundering investigation since 2017.

In June 2020, a Paris court sentenced Rifaat to four years in prison; hence, his properties in Paris and London would be seized. In September 2022, France's highest court, the Cour de Cassation, confirmed the four-year prison sentence.

Personal life
In 2010, Rifaat was living in Mayfair, London.  he was living in Avenue Foch, Paris, while trying to sell off his real estate properties.

Rifaat married four times and his polygamous marriages as well as the marriages of his children have produced strong alliances and ties with prominent families and prestigious clans within Syria and the Arab world . He firstly married one of his cousins, Amirah, from al-Qurdahah. Then, he married Salma Makhlouf, a cousin of Hafez Assad's wife, Anisa. His third spouse is a young woman from the traditional Sunni Muslim establishment, Rajaa Bakrat. His fourth wife, Lina al-Khayyir, is from one of the most prominent Alawite families in Syria. The sister of one of his spouses was married to the late King Abdullah of Saudi Arabia.

Rifaat's daughter Tumadir married Muin Nassif Kheir Beik, a member of the most powerful and prestigious Alawite family. His son-in-law is a relative of the Syrian activist and poet Kamal Kheir Beik. Tamadhin, another daughter, married a Makhlouf. Lama married Ala Fayyad, the son of Alawite General Shafiq Fayadh. Rifaat's eldest son, Mudar, married Maya Haydar, the daughter of the ultra-rich entrepreneur Muhammad Haydar from the prominent al-Haddadin Alawite tribe. His youngest son, Ribal Al-Assad, born 1975, is a businessman and political activist. He resided in Paris and has spoken frequently on French and international media on the Syrian crisis.

Return to Syria 

In October 2021, Rifaat returned to Damascus at the age of 84. Syrian President Bashar al-Assad allowed his uncle, Rifaat al-Assad, to return to the country after decades in exile in order "to avoid imprisonment in France".

See also

Al-Assad family
Presidency of Hafez al-Assad

References

Bibliography

External links

1937 births
Rifaat al-Assad
Damascus University alumni
Living people
Members of the Regional Command of the Arab Socialist Ba'ath Party – Syria Region
People of the Islamic uprising in Syria
People of the Syrian civil war
Syrian generals
Vice presidents of Syria
Homs Military Academy alumni
Grand Croix of the Légion d'honneur
Syrian money launderers
Syrian white-collar criminals